Glédson Ribeiro dos Santos (born 6 February 1983), simply known as Glédson, is a Brazilian footballer who plays for Oeste as a goalkeeper.

Club career
Born in Almenara, Minas Gerais, Gledson graduated from São Bernardo FC's youth system. He made his first team debuts in 2004, and after a short loan spell at Marcílio Dias in 2005, joined União Suzano in 2006.

After appearing mainly in the lower levels, notably representing Paysandu and Santa Cruz, Gledson moved to Náutico in January 2009. Initially a third-choice, he made his Série A debut on 29 July 2009, starting in a 1–2 home loss against Santos.

After losing his starting spot in 2011, Gledson left the club in December, and signed for Boa Esporte on 18 January 2012. On 30 April, after appearing regularly in Campeonato Mineiro, he moved to Portuguesa.

Honours
Santa Cruz
Copa Pernambuco: 2008

Náutico
Copa Pernambuco: 2011

Portuguesa
Campeonato Paulista Série A2: 2013

Campinense
Campeonato Paraibano: 2015, 2016

Avaí
Campeonato Catarinense: 2019, 2021

References

External links

1983 births
Living people
Sportspeople from Minas Gerais
Brazilian footballers
Association football goalkeepers
Campeonato Brasileiro Série A players
Campeonato Brasileiro Série B players
Campeonato Brasileiro Série D players
São Bernardo Futebol Clube players
Clube Náutico Marcílio Dias players
União Suzano Atlético Clube players
FC Cascavel players
Paysandu Sport Club players
Oeste Futebol Clube players
Santa Cruz Futebol Clube players
Clube Náutico Capibaribe players
Boa Esporte Clube players
Associação Portuguesa de Desportos players
Campinense Clube players
Sociedade Esportiva e Recreativa Caxias do Sul players
América Futebol Clube (RN) players
Avaí FC players